Gack is a village in the administrative district of Gmina Drawno, within Choszczno County, West Pomeranian Voivodeship, in north-western Poland.

Before 1945 the village was German-settled and part of the German state of Prussia.

References

Gack